Geoff or Geoffrey Thompson may refer to:

 Geoffrey Thompson (British Army officer) (1905–1983), British Army general
 Geoffrey Hewlett Thompson (born 1929), British Anglican bishop
 Geoffrey Thompson (businessman) (1936–2004), owner and managing director of Blackpool Pleasure Beach
 Geoff Thompson (politician) (born 1940), New Zealand Member of Parliament
 Geoff Thompson (football executive) (born 1945), British football administrator, chairman of The Football Association
 Geoffrey Thompson (doctor) (born 1945), Australian sports physician
 Geoff Thompson (writer) (born 1960), British writer and self-defence instructor
 Geoff Thompson (karateka), British karate fighter
 Geoff Thompson (snooker player) (born 1929), English snooker player
 Geoffrey Harington Thompson (1898–1967), British diplomat

See also 
 Geoff Thomson (born 1959), Australian cricketer
 Jeff Thompson (disambiguation)
 Jeffrey Thomson (disambiguation)